, there were about 3,500 electric vehicles registered in Alberta, equivalent to about 0.1% of all vehicles in the province. , around 2.3% of new cars sold in Alberta were electric.

Government policy
, the provincial government does not offer any tax incentives for electric vehicle purchases.

Charging stations
, there were 255 public charging stations in Alberta.

Public opinion
In a poll conducted in 2021 by KPMG, 54% of Albertans said it was "likely" or "very likely" that their next vehicle purchase would be electric.

In a 2022 poll conducted by the Alberta Motor Association, 27% of respondents were interested in buying an electric vehicle.

By region

Calgary
, there were about 3,000 electric vehicles in Calgary. , there were about 200 public charging stations in the city.

In a 2022 poll conducted by the Alberta Motor Association, 31% of respondents in Calgary were interested in buying an electric vehicle.

Edmonton
, there were 60 electric buses in the Edmonton city fleet.

Lethbridge
In a 2022 poll conducted by the Alberta Motor Association, 30% of respondents in Lethbridge were interested in buying an electric vehicle.

Medicine Hat
, there were eight electric vehicles in the Medicine Hat municipal fleet.

Red Deer
, there was one public DC charging station in Red Deer.

The first electric vehicle in the Red Deer County fleet was introduced in November 2022.

Wood Buffalo
, there were no public DC charging stations in the Regional Municipality of Wood Buffalo.

References

Alberta
Transport in Alberta